Ghormley is a surname. Notable people with the surname include:

N. Rex Ghormley (1941–2009), American optometrist
Robert L. Ghormley (1883–1958), US Navy Admiral
Timothy F. Ghormley, US Marine Corps Major General

See also
Gormley

Surnames of Irish origin